Broken is the sixth EP released by the South Korean boy group MBLAQ. The album was released online on March 24, 2014 at 12PM (KST). The album consists of 7 tracks, and Wheesung took part in the writing of the lyrics and composing for the title song Be a Man, whereby he gifted the song to MBLAQ. He expressed that "MBLAQ is the only male group that I wanted to give a song to, so it was a pleasure to work with them on the album. I am thankful for MBLAQ for conveying the feelings that I wanted from this track".

Concept 
The concept shows the members' chic and strong 'masculine' mature image. Filter imitating broken glass overlaid by the members' images, which are included in the concept photos, were uploaded on the official MBLAQ's SNS and creates a rainbow set of colours. This is in contrast to the meaning of the album's name, Broken, whereby it shows how a heart can grow cold when broken, as portrayed by the members' angry and hard gazes.

Background 
On March 20 at 12AM (KST), MBLAQ released their teaser of "Be a Man" on their official YouTube channel, J.Tune Camp. It shows the sleek and sophisticated images of the members, as they wore well-tailored black and white suits together with clean-cut hair, appearing mysterious with their sharp gaze. It further dramatizes the video through the added fog and shadow effects.

Track listing

Chart performance

Album chart

Single chart

Sales and certifications

Release history

References

External links
 MBLAQ's Official Site

2014 EPs
MBLAQ EPs
Korean-language EPs